Tangerine is a group of orange-colored citrus fruit.

Tangerine may also refer to:

Arts and entertainment

Music 
 Tangerine (Dexter Gordon album) (1972)
 Tangerine (Vixen album) (1998)
 Tangerine (David Mead album) (2006)
 "Tangerine" (1941 song), written by Johnny Mercer and Victor Schertzinger
 "Tangerine" (Led Zeppelin song) (1970)
 "Tangerine" (Feeder song) (1997)
Tangerine (band)
 "Tangerine", a song by Life of Agony from the album Soul Searching Sun (1997)
 "Tangerine", a song by Prince from the album Rave Un2 the Joy Fantastic (1999)
 "Tangerine", a song by Big Boi from the album Sir Lucious Left Foot: The Son of Chico Dusty (2010)
 "Tangerine", a song by Miley Cyrus from the album Miley Cyrus & Her Dead Petz (2015)
 "Tangerine", a song by Glass Animals from the album Dreamland (2020)
 "Tangerine", a song by Kehlani from the album Blue Water Road (2022)

Films, television and musicals
 Tangerines (film), Estonian-Georgian film (2013)
 Tangerine (film), American film (2015)
 Tangerine (musical), Broadway musical (1921)
 "Chapter Sixty-Six: Tangerine", a 2019 episode of the television series Riverdale

Literature
 Tangerine (Bloor novel), a 1997 novel by Edward Bloor
 Tangerine (Mangan novel), a 2018 novel by Christine Mangan
 Tangerine (comics), character in Marvel Comics

Businesses
 Tangerine Bank, Canadian bank, formerly known as ING Direct
 Tangerine Computer Systems, early computer manufacturer
 Tangerine Confectionery, British confectionery company
 Tangerine Records (1962), a record label owned by Ray Charles between 1962 and 1973
 Tangerine Records (1992), a UK-based independent record label founded in 1992 by Paul Bevoir, Chris Hunt and John Ashworth

Other uses
 Tangerine, Florida, U.S.
 Tangerine (cable system), a submarine telecommunications cable system
 Tangerine (color), an orange-color hue used to give the impression of the tangerine fruit
 Tangerine (software), a cross-platform music server

See also
 Tangerine Dream, German electronic-music group (1967–present)
 Tangier, a city in northwestern Morocco